David C. Carter  (November 27, 1953 – July 10, 2021) was an American professional football player who was an offensive guard and center for nine seasons in the National Football League (NFL) for the Houston Oilers and New Orleans Saints. He played college football at Western Kentucky University.

Carter died at age 67 on July 10, 2021.

References

1953 births
2021 deaths
People from Vincennes, Indiana
American football offensive guards
American football centers
Western Kentucky Hilltoppers football players
Houston Oilers players
New Orleans Saints players
Players of American football from Indiana